Daniel Lienert-Brown (born 9 February 1993) is a New Zealand rugby union player who currently plays as a loosehead prop for  in New Zealand's domestic Mitre 10 Cup and the  in the international Super Rugby competition.

Early career

Born and raised in Christchurch along with younger brother Anton who would go on to become an All Black, Daniel attended Christchurch Boys' High School and played for the school's first XV rugby team.   His next step was to become a member of the Crusaders Knights development team in 2014 while at the same time turning out for High School Old Boys in Canterbury's local club rugby competition.

Senior career

Despite facing a fierce battle for game time from fellow looseheads; Joe Moody and Alex Hodgman, Lienert-Brown asserted himself well and started 6 times during the season and also managed to net his first provincial try. With Moody spending the entire 2016 Mitre 10 Cup campaign with the All Blacks, Lienert-Brown saw his opportunities for playing time increase and he played in 10 of Canterbury's 12 games throughout a year which culminated in them winning the Mitre 10 Cup Premiership once more, this time with a comprehensive 43–27 win over Tasman which made it 8 provincial titles in 9 years for the red and blacks.

Super Rugby

Despite only being aged 21 and having no provincial experience under his belt, a front-row injury crisis for Christchurch-based Super Rugby franchise, the  midway through the 2014 season saw him receive an unexpected call up. He made 2 substitute appearances in total throughout the year, but was unable to secure a contract with any of New Zealand's 5 Super Rugby franchises for 2015, however, injuries once more provided him an opportunity and this time it was one he would take.

Tony Brown replaced the  bound Jamie Joseph as the Highlanders head coach ahead of the 2017 Super Rugby season and he retained Lienert-Brown in the squad for his first campaign in charge.

International

Lienert-Brown was a member of the New Zealand Under 20 team which finished 4th in the 2013 IRB Junior World Championship in France.   Not originally named in the squad, he was called up as an injury replacement for future Canterbury teammate, Alex Hodgman and went on to make 2 substitute appearances.

Career Honours

Highlanders

Super Rugby - 2015

Canterbury

National Provincial Championship - 2015, 2016

Super Rugby Statistics

References

1993 births
Living people
New Zealand rugby union players
New Zealand sportspeople of Samoan descent
Crusaders (rugby union) players
Highlanders (rugby union) players
Canterbury rugby union players
Rugby union props
People educated at Christchurch Boys' High School
Rugby union players from Christchurch
Moana Pasifika players